Grevillea fuscolutea is a species of flowering plant in the family Proteaceae and is endemic to a small area in the south-west of Western Australia. It is an erect shrub with egg-shaped to more or less linear leaves, and dull yellow-orange flowers.

Description
The edges of the leaves are turned down or rolled under, the lower surface densely covered with shaggy hairs, and there is a small black point on the tip. Regeneration is from seed. The species is closely related to Grevillea fistulosa but differs in having a
ring of hair in the perianth, and yellow instead of red flowers.

Taxonomy
Grevillea fuscolutea was first collected by William Webb in 1879 and then again 100 years later by a Forestry Department survey group. It was collected from the same locale several times over the following years. Long recognised as being part of the Grevillea drummondii complex, it was first formally described in 1992 by Gregory John Keighery in the journal Nuytsia from material he collected in 1989. The specific epithet (fuscolutea) means "brownish yellow".

Distribution and habit
Grevillea fuscolutea is found amongst low trees in rocky or stoney soils as well as on sand and loam over granite. It is restricted to upper slopes of Mount Lindesay, to the north east of Denmark in the heathland and around granite outcrops.

Conservation status

See also
 List of Grevillea species

References

fuscolutea
Proteales of Australia
Eudicots of Western Australia
Taxa named by Gregory John Keighery
Endemic flora of Western Australia
Plants described in 1992